Bennetts Mill is an unincorporated community in Montgomery County, Virginia, in the United States.

History
Bennetts Mill contained a post office from 1876 until 1906. M. D. Bennett was an early postmaster.

References

Unincorporated communities in Montgomery County, Virginia
Unincorporated communities in Virginia